The 2020 ADAC Formula 4 Championship was the sixth season of the ADAC Formula 4, an open-wheel motor racing series. It was a multi-event motor racing championship that featured drivers competing in 1.4 litre Tatuus-Abarth single seat race cars that conformed to the technical regulations for the championship. The season was won by Red Bull junior Jonny Edgar.

Teams and drivers

Race calendar and results
The initial calendar was released on 10 January 2020. On 10 April 2020 the series announced a revised calendar, delaying the start of the season due to the 2019-20 coronavirus pandemic. The second Nürburgring event supported the 2020 24 Hours of Nürburgring, while the other rounds supported the 2020 ADAC GT Masters. Another altered 7-round calendar was released on 24 May 2020. The sixth race weekend of the season was moved from Circuit Zandvoort to Lausitzring due to the high number of infections in the Netherlands and the classification as a risk area by the German government.

Championship standings
Points were awarded to the top 10 classified finishers in each race. No points were awarded for pole position or fastest lap. The final classification was obtained by summing up the scores on the 19 best results, including disqualifications mandatorily, obtained during the races held.

Drivers' Championship

Rookie Championship

Teams' Cup

Notes

References

External links
 

ADAC Formula 4 seasons
ADAC
ADAC Formula 4
ADAC Formula 4
ADAC Formula 4